Kang Joo-hee (born May 6, 1999), better known by the stage name Rothy, is a South Korean singer. She made her debut on November 9, 2017, with the digital single "Stars". She was known as "Shin Seung-hun's Muse" by reporters.

Early life 
Rothy attended Incheon Annam Middle School. She graduated from the Department of Applied Music at Hanlim Multi Art School.

Career

2013–2016: Pre-debut 
After auditioning in middle school, Rothy joined Dorothy Company, receiving direct training from Shin Seung-hun for four years before making her debut. On her atypical idol training, Rothy said, "I went to a song camp, learned dance, and learned guitar. I focused on vocal training, but there were two teachers. I also received personalized one-on-one guidance from CEO Shin Seung-hun. That would be the differentiating point."

2017: "Stars" 
Rothy released her first single "Stars" on November 9, 2017. "Stars" contains the story of a girl who is looking for her dream. Producer Shin Seung-hun said, "I'm trying to start Rothy with empathy. Knowing that she wants to sing songs that comfort her friends despite her age, she spent the last days of her teenage years looking for comfort and confidence in her self-identity and confusion." As a producer, he revealed his sincere wish, saying, "It's important to gain popularity, but I hope that people who sympathize with my song will find the reward as a musician."

After the release of a "Face Live" video for "Stars" on the M2 Voice YouTube Channel, Rothy had a "chart reversal", ranking 3rd in real-time search terms on Melon, entered the Genie Music Top 100 and ranked 59th, and also rose 167 places from 368th to 194th on Melon, the highest ranking since its release.

Rothy was invited as a guest the year-end concert "2017 THE Shin Seung-hun SHOW-Winter Special" at the Olympic Hall in Olympic Park, Seoul for three days from December 15 to 17.

2018: Shape of Rothy 
On January 2, 2018, Rothy released "Baby Baby" with U-Kwon of Block B for the OST of Jugglers.

On June 1, Rothy released her second single "Tagger". Rothy, who turned 20, showed a more mature story of finding herself. Yoo Seung-ho appears in the music video for the track.

On June 27, she released "A Little Bit More" with Jinho of Pentagon for the OST of What's Wrong with Secretary Kim?. On July 8, Rothy released the song "Butterfly Effect" for the drama RE:Playlist. The track is a remake of Shin Seung-hun's "Butterfly Effect".

On August 30, Rothy released her first mini-album Shape of Rothy with the title track "Burning", a trendy up-tempo tropical house genre song, with a sophisticated melody that makes you feel like listening to a pop song, and sensuous lyrics that compare love to candlelight and fireflies. On September 7, she appeared on Yoo Hee-yeol's Sketchbook. On September 20, she appeared on M Countdown with "Stars", said to have reflected listeners' requests.

On October 1, she released the track "Cloud" for the OST of The Beauty Inside. "Cloud" is a love song containing a shy heart that wants to hide the feelings that are blooming everywhere and is used in the first episode of the show.

2019: "Blossom Flower", Color of Rothy 
On January 30, 2019, Rothy released her third single "Blossom Flower", a song that compares an unknown flower and a bed abandoned on the roadside to the pain of parting. The track uses both acoustic guitar and an orchestra. The track ranked 2nd on Genie and Olleh Music, 6th on Monkey3, 8th on Soribada, 14th on Naver Music, 20th on Bugs, 26th on Melon, and 30th on Mnet.

On February 10, she released "Rainbow" for the OST of Romance is a Bonus Book. On February 11, Shin Seung-hun x Rothy's Tello brand sound "Fortune Teller" was released. On February 18, Rothy's official fandom name "Bloomimg" was announced. "Blooming", which means flowers are in full bloom, resembles Rothy and symbolizes people as beautiful as flowers, also containing the meaning of wishing Rothy and Blooming to always walk together along the path of flowers in full bloom.

On May 27, Rothy's second mini-album Color of Rothy was released with the title track "Bee". With Shape of Rothy representing a sketch, Color of Rothy represented color. This was Rothy's second song with a choreography after "Burning". Rothy said, “my title track, 'Bee', is a hip-hop R&B song that shows a very cute, chic, and bold side with lyrics that compare bees to flowers". On the b-side track "I've Grown More Than Yesterday", she said that "it's a song that I have a lot of affection for because it contains the story of my growth."

Rothy competed on King of Mask Singer as "Sweet Voice", becoming a runner-up after placing second to Kyuhyun of Super Junior in the final round.

2020–present: Singles 
On July 4, 2020, Rothy released "Sleepless Night" for Backstreet Rookie. On August 13, she released "Ocean View" featuring Chanyeol of Exo.

On June 9, 2021, she released "We will be not all together" for At a Distance, Spring Is Green with Han Seung-yoon. On October 14, Rothy released "Cold Love". On November 21, she released "Our Road" for the OST of Jirisan.

On March 12, 2022, she released "Something Precious" for the OST of Forecasting Love and Weather. On July 5, Rothy released "Changed Number".

Artistry 
Rothy has stated that she admires Jessie J, and that when she first saw Jessie J perform live, she fell in love at first sight with her charisma, singing, performance, stage manners, confidence, and enjoyment. She said that while looking for performance videos from middle school, she had a heart that wants "to love music and enjoy music as an activity rather than a job."

Rothy has also referred to IU as a role model, saying that she wants to become a top artist like her, and as a solo female singer, someone can look at her and walk with her.

In Rothy's first profile, she said that her charm is her voice, because she has a voice that is the opposite of her appearance, which surprises people.

Discography

Extended plays

Singles

Soundtrack appearances

Filmography

Film

Television shows

References

1999 births
Living people
21st-century South Korean women singers
Hanlim Multi Art School alumni
Musicians from Incheon